Brass models, made of brass or similar alloys, are scale models typically of railroad equipment, bridges and occasionally, of buildings. Although die-cast or plastic models have made considerable advances in late 1990s and continue to improve, brass models offer finer details. Brass models, considered to be collector's pieces and museum quality finish, are often used for display purposes rather than model railroad operations. However, these can be made fully operational and many railroaders do use them on their model railroads. They are generally considerably more expensive than other types of models due to limited production quantities and the "handmade" nature of the product itself.

History
In the late 1950s, Japan was known for producing low cost toys and products for export. The first brass model train were born during the occupation of Japan by Allied forces. Members of allied forces saw some of the models built by various craftsman and procured photos of American steam locomotive prototypes for these artisans to model. These were the early hand-built high quality brass models, built with relatively crude equipment in comparison to tools that became available later. Some people in the model railroad industry took note of what was being done and started importing these models to the United States. The scale of import increased with time. Bill Ryan of PFM (Pacific Fast Mail) was one of the early importers, and to this day the name PFM is synonymous with brass model trains.

The quality of Japanese models continued to improve but with an improving domestic economy, manufacturing cost also increased. Eventually, importers moved their operations to Korea for cost benefits. Although the quality suffered considerably in the early years of this transition, within a few years some very fine brass models were being built.  Korea continues to produce fine models; Boo-Rim Precision of Korea is among the most renowned producers of brass models.

Thousands of brass model trains have been produced throughout the years. Initially their price was comparable to that of die-cast models, but the detail was far superior. The quality and details of brass models have increased with time along with its price. As of 2014, an articulated HO scale, highly detailed model may retail for as much as US $3000; larger scales can cost even more. The collectibility of late run highly detailed models, along with lower availability, generally keeps the prices high. Historically, the most desirable models have continued to rise in value. Mid-run (1960-1985) models, in particular unpainted models, have appeared to drop in value lately, as they are becoming less desirable in comparison with newer models with much better details. These models still often sell for several times the original suggested retail price.

Glossary of brass model train terminology:
 Handbuilt - Generally refers to the early models made for the GIs that were built entirely by hand. In many ways brass models are still handbuilt to this day.
 Crown - At first these were very limited runs of the highest quality models imported by PFM.  Later the term was used a bit more loosely, though generally only for very high quality models.  Other importers used phrases such as 'Ruby' (Gem Models), 'Royale Series' (Custom Brass), or something similar.
 Factory Painted - A model painted by the builder.  Some models were painted in the USA after being imported.  Though these paint jobs were commissioned by the importer and are normally high quality, they would be considered custom painted.
 Custom Paint - This has a broad meaning, as the quality can vary widely; however, it means any model that is painted, but not by the builder.
 Pro Paint - This term should only be used by professional painters.  The quality of a true professional should be very close to that of a factory painted model.
 Plated - A term for nickel plating; often brass drivers (wheels) are nickel-plated, silver color.  At times entire models are nickel-plated (they look like silver).
 Wheel Wear - This refers to brass showing through on the drivers (wheels).  This happens when the engine has been run enough on a track to wear through the nickel plating, and often is a sign of somewhat heavy use of the model.
 Drawbar - The bar that connects a steam locomotive to the tender.  Often needed for a good electrical connection.
 Open Frame Motor - Used on earlier models, generally up until the early 1970s.  You can see the armature, brushes on the sides of the motor.
 Can Motor - A more desirable motor, as it generally offers more power, and needs less maintenance.  The motor is enclosed in a 'can', and the brushes cannot be seen.

Manufacturers

Manufacturers of brass models include:

Bavaria
Boo-Rim Precision
Ajin Precision
Fulgurex
Lemaco

Active Importers, both in the USA and Europe include:
Precision Scale Models, Inc
Glacier Park Models
The Coach Yard
Union Terminal Imports
North Bank Line
Micro Metakit
Overland Models Inc.
Key Model Imports
Sunset Models, 3rd Rail

Importers that are no longer active include:

Railway Classics
Shoreham Shops
W&R Enterprises
Weinert
Classic Construction Models
Max Gray
Pacific Fast Mail
WestSide Model Company
Ferro Swiss
KTM
NJ International, Custom Brass
E.Suydam & Company
Tenshodo
Von Stetina Artworks
EFC-Loko
TOLOLOKO

See also
Rail transport modelling
Scale models
HO scale

References

External links
For further information please refer to:
The Brass Train Guide Book (http://www.brasstrains.com/Classic/Product/Detail/030010/The-Brass-Train-Guide-Book-Deluxe-Edition)
Brass Model Trains Price & Data Guide Volume 2 (http://www.brasstrains.com/Classic/Product/Detail/030003/Brass-Model-Trains-Price-Data-Guide-Volume-2)
Online Brass Guide LIVE (www.brassguide.com)
Brass Department

Scale modeling
Rail transport modelling